Oofotr is a Norwegian music group consisting of jazz musicians from Narvik. They arrange traditional music from Ofoten and had their debut in Kjeldebotn Church, 1994 with music contributions from local historian Magnus Pettersen from Ballangen. After a series of performances on the north Norwegian music and album, belonged new material from Tromsø Museum and a second album in 2001.

The band combines ambient and world music and is partly inspired by Sandbakk's engagement with the Trondheim choir Chorus, as in 1981–82  recordings of Ballangen music. "Oofotr" comes from Ofoten in Aslak Bolt's land register.

Band members 
Kjersti Stubø - vocal
Ernst-Wiggo Sandbakk - drums
Jørn Øien - piano

Discography 
Oofotr (Norske Gram, 1995)
Oofotr II (Heilo, 2001)

References

External links 
Oofotr Official Website

Norwegian jazz ensembles
Musical groups established in 1993
Musical groups from Oslo
1993 establishments in Norway
Heilo Music artists